is a Japanese actress. She appeared in more than fifteen films since 1996.

Selected filmography

References

External links
 

1971 births
Living people
People from Kōchi, Kōchi
Japanese film actresses
Japanese television actresses